Fred Cobain, MBE (born 30 April 1946) is a Democratic Unionist Party (DUP) politician from Northern Ireland. He was an Ulster Unionist Party (UUP) Member of the Northern Ireland Assembly (MLA) for Belfast North from 1998 until 2011.

Political career 
Cobain was first elected to Belfast City Council in 1985. He served as Lord Mayor of Belfast in 1990–1991. In 1996 he was an unsuccessful candidate in the Northern Ireland Forum election in North Belfast. He had been an Ulster Unionist Party Northern Ireland Assembly Member for North Belfast since 1998.

Cobain was Chair of the Assembly's Committee for Social Development and served two terms on the Northern Ireland Policing Board

On 29 December 2007 he was named MBE in the New Year Honours 2008.

After the Christmas 2010 water crisis, Cobain supported a vote of no confidence in Regional Development Minister Conor Murphy, saying "At the end of the day in all of these issues the individual who leads the department is responsible and I have to say if this was any other part of the UK, or any other part of these islands, the minister would have been away weeks ago...This minister doesn't appear to accept any responsibility for anything."

On 14 January 2013, Fred Cobain left the Ulster Unionist party which he had served for more than 30 years. He joined the Democratic Unionist Party saying the UUP was "riven with personal and policy divisions" and was "politically exhausted". Cobain was co-opted on to Carrickfergus Borough Council as a councillor for the Carrick Castle area.  He ran for the DUP but failed to be elected to the Mid and East Antrim Borough Council in the May 2014 Elections.

Family
He is married and has two children.

References

Living people
1946 births
Members of Belfast City Council
Members of Carrickfergus Borough Council
Lord Mayors of Belfast
Members of the Order of the British Empire
Northern Ireland MLAs 1998–2003
Northern Ireland MLAs 2003–2007
Northern Ireland MLAs 2007–2011
Ulster Unionist Party MLAs
Democratic Unionist Party politicians
Ulster Unionist Party councillors